Lars Volden (born July 26, 1992) is a Norwegian professional ice hockey goaltender who currently plays for the BIK Karlskoga of the HockeyAllsvenskan (Allsv). He was drafted 181st overall by the Boston Bruins in the 2011 NHL Entry Draft. He has also played for the Norwegian national team in several World Championships, and at the 2014 Winter Olympics.

Playing career 
Volden joined the Swedish second tier club, Rögle BK, from Espoo Blues of the Finnish Liiga on a one-year deal on April 29, 2014.

Volden returned from a two seasons in the Czech Extraliga, to continue his European in Sweden, agreeing to a contract with IK Pantern of the HockeyAllsvenskan for the 2018–19 season. As Pantern's starting goaltender he made 44 appearances in posting a .920 save percentage. He was loaned at the tail end of the season to the Malmö Redhawks appearing in 3 regular season games.

On 29 April 2019, Volden's loan move to the Redhawks was made permanent in securing a two-year contract through to 2021.

International play
On January 7, 2014 Volden was named to Norway's national ice hockey team that competed in the 2014 Winter Olympics in Sochi.

Awards and honours 
 Named Best Goaltender at the 2010 World U18 Championship Division IA

References

External links 
 
 Norwegian born players drafted by NHL teams

1992 births
Living people
BIK Karlskoga players
Boston Bruins draft picks
HC Dukla Jihlava players
HK Dukla Trenčín players
Espoo Blues players
Ice hockey players at the 2014 Winter Olympics
Jokipojat players
Malmö Redhawks players
Norwegian expatriate sportspeople in Sweden
Norwegian ice hockey goaltenders
Norwegian ice hockey players
Olympic ice hockey players of Norway
Ice hockey people from Oslo
Stavanger Oilers players
Norwegian expatriate sportspeople in Slovakia
Norwegian expatriate sportspeople in Finland
Norwegian expatriate sportspeople in the Czech Republic
Expatriate ice hockey players in Sweden
Expatriate ice hockey players in the Czech Republic
Expatriate ice hockey players in Finland
Expatriate ice hockey players in Slovakia
Norwegian expatriate ice hockey people